Öster-Malma Castle is a Baroque-style manor house at Nyköping Municipality in Södermanland,  Sweden. It is situated on the shores of Lake Malmasjön.

History
Öster Malma was built in 1668 according to drawings by Jean De la Vallée (1624-1696) during the ownership of Wilhelm Böös Drakenhielm  (1624-1676) and Anna Maria Silfverstierna (1643–1697).  Drakenhielm was a royal Chamberlain and  Chief Customs Officer who also owned the estates Hanstavik  and Stjärnholm  in Södermanland. 
Öster-Malma remained owned by members of the Drakenhielm family until 1738.
From 1900,  the main building was renovated. After major refurbishment, Öster Malma hotel, restaurant & conference was inaugurated in 2003. 
The castle has a surrounding wildlife park, which is open every month of the year except for September and is used as a nature preserve as well as an educational park.
The castle is currently owned by Svenska Jägareförbundet, known in English as the Swedish Hunters' Association (SHA).

See also
List of castles in Sweden

References

External links
Öster-Malma website

 Buildings and structures in Södermanland County